Ocean Water Park is a  outdoor water park located in Kish Island, Iran. It is the first Iranian outdoor themed water park based on the story of the Mystery of the Sun Castle. It opened in January 2017 and has 13 rides, four swimming pools and one spa in addition to two restaurants, four beverage stops and coffee shops and two shopping areas. The Water Park's theming has been implemented under the supervision of Ahmad Jafari, veteran architect and Disney NFFC legend.

The water park has several localized features, as well as unique rides in the region. The park offers women only days to accommodate its Muslim patrons since it is located in a predominantly Muslim region, a common practice for Arab countries in the region. Ocean Water Park also has one of the tallest rides in the region, Pichaloop, with a 24 meter drop.

Park Story 

Water Park's story is based on a group of pirates attacking an island in Persian Gulf. Pirates, headed by Captain Sayan, raid and capture the Sun Castle in order to obtain the Sun Orb and rule the ocean. Three brothers, named Pullad, Mahan, and Bashoo, the residents of the Sun Castle, decide to fight against the pirates and reclaim the Sun Castle...

Rides 
Currently, there are 13 rides in Ocean Water Park. The list Includes:

 Pichaloop (AquaLoop)
 Adrenaline (Free Fall)
 Rally Ride (Whizzard)
 Anaconda (Double Viper)
 Dingle (Boomerango)

 Gerdab (Super Bowl)
 Marpich (Inner Tubes)
 Challab (Aqua Play)
 Russin River (Lazy River)
 Berkoo (Kids Slides)
 Tsunami (Wave Pool)
 Mojab (Flow Rider)

Swimming Pools
There are four swimming pools in Ocean Water Park:
 Aban (Adult Pool)
 Abtin (Teen Pool)
 Rabo (Jacuzzi)
 Dingo (Family Jacuzzi)

Other Areas and Services 
There are various themed restaurants and beverage stops in Ocean Water park, in addition to Shopping areas and a massage center. These areas offer various types of fast foods, drinks, souvenir and swimming gear and accessories shops. Also. locker rooms and bathrooms are provided. One of the features of the water park is that it offers exclusive women-only days, suitable for Muslim tourists of the Middle East region.
Plumeria Spa:  A massage center, designed for massage and relaxation services.

Wrist Bands: Guests  deposit money in their magnetic guest wrist bands and don't carry wallets or purses throughout the park for buying food and beverage. Unused funds on the wrist band will be refunded back to the guest.
Food and Beverages:
There are two themed restaurants and four themed beverage shops in Ocean Water Park. ZamboZimbo offers hot and cold sandwiches, perfect for between meals. Chico is the main restaurant in Ocean Water park and offers salads, appetizers, pizzas, fried chicken, etc. Also for beverages, guests can stop by Fruitila, Noushak, Coffeesa, and Jetsemina Cave

See also 
 List of Water Parks
 Kish Island, Iran

References

External links 
 Official Website
 Ezam Investment Holding

Amusement parks in Iran
Water parks